4. deild karla (e. Men's fourth division) is a football league in Iceland. It is the fifth and bottom division in the Icelandic football league system.

Format
The division was added to the Icelandic football league system before the 2013 season to make room for a fourth nationwide league. It will be largely the same in format as the previous 3. deild karla was.

Group stage
The division is split into four groups with teams in each group playing the other teams in the same group twice, home and away.  The top two teams in each group qualify for the play-off stage for a total of eight teams in the playoffs.

Play-off stage
The play-offs are played in a knock-out format. Teams are drawn together and play home and away, the winning team progressing to the next round. There is no away goal rule; if teams are drawn at the end of the second match, extra time is played. If after extra time teams are still drawn, penalties decide the winner.

The final is a single match played on a neutral ground. The winner of the final is the 4th division champion. Both teams that reach the final are promoted to the third division.

There is also a match played for the third place where the losing teams from the semi-finals play. This is also a single match on a neutral ground.

Current clubs (2022)

 Árborg
 GG
 Hamrarnir
 Hvíti Riddarinn
 KFK
 KH
 Tindastóll
 Uppsveitir
 Vængir Júpiters
 Ýmir
 Hamar

Past winners
Promoted teams shown in green

1 - KFS promoted due to 3. deild club Grundarfjörður deciding not to compete in 2015.
2 - Kórdrengir promoted due to the 2019 3. deild expanding from 10 to 12 teams.
3 - Vængir Júpiters promoted due to the merger of 2. deild clubs Ungmennafélagið Leiknir and Knattspyrnufélag Fjarðabyggðar into Knattspyrnufélag Austfjarða.

References

External links
 IcelandFootball.net - List of Fifth Level Champions. 
 SOCCERWAY - 4.deild summary

5
Iceland
Professional sports leagues in Iceland